Ryszard Zub (24 March 1934 – 11 January 2015) was a Polish fencer. He won a silver medal in the team sabre events at the 1956 and 1960 Summer Olympics and a bronze in the same event at the 1964 Summer Olympics. He died in Padua at the age of 80 in 2015.

References

1934 births
2015 deaths
Polish male fencers
Olympic fencers of Poland
Fencers at the 1956 Summer Olympics
Fencers at the 1960 Summer Olympics
Fencers at the 1964 Summer Olympics
Olympic silver medalists for Poland
Olympic bronze medalists for Poland
Olympic medalists in fencing
People from Lviv Oblast
People from Lwów Voivodeship
Medalists at the 1956 Summer Olympics
Medalists at the 1960 Summer Olympics
Medalists at the 1964 Summer Olympics
20th-century Polish people
21st-century Polish people